DaCosta may refer to:

People
António Dacosta (1914–1990), Portuguese painter and poet
Dacosta Goore (born 1984), Ivorian football defender
Morton DaCosta (1914–1989), American theatre and film director, film producer, writer, and actor
Noel DaCosta (1929–2002), Nigerian-Jamaican composer, jazz violinist, and choral conductor
Sagarika DaCosta (born 1970), Indian-Italian singer and actress
Yaya DaCosta (born 1982), American actress and fashion model

Other uses
DaCosta, New Jersey, an unincorporated community
Martin DaCosta, fictional character from the Japanese SF anime television series Mobile Suit Gundam SEED